El Cajon Transit Center is a San Diego Trolley station served by the Orange and the Green lines in the San Diego suburb of El Cajon, California. The station is a major commuter center for the large suburb, and is the convergence of multiple local and regional bus routes operated by the Metropolitan Transit System and Greyhound Lines.

History

From July 1995 to July 2005, Orange Line service continued through to terminate at the end of the line at Santee Town Center.

The September 2012 system redesign truncated the Orange Line once again to El Cajon.

Courthouse became the line's current western terminus, and the one-stop extension to Arnele was meant to relieve congestion and confusion at El Cajon.

Station layout
There are two tracks, each served by a side platform.

See also
 List of San Diego Trolley stations

References

Green Line (San Diego Trolley)
Orange Line (San Diego Trolley)
San Diego Trolley stations
El Cajon, California
Railway stations in the United States opened in 1989
1989 establishments in California